Austerity is a policy of deficit-cutting, which by definition requires lower spending, higher taxes, or both.

Austerity or Austere may also refer to:

Music
 Austere, a now-defunct Australian black metal duo that featured Tim Yatras as a member
 Austere (EDM group), an ambient electronic music group from Portland, Oregon
 Austere (EP), a 2002 EP by Sparta
 "Austere" (song), a 2008 song by The Joy Formidable
 Austerity (band), a funeral doom band

Steam locomotives
 Hunslet Austerity 0-6-0ST
 SR Q1 class
 WD Austerity 2-8-0
 WD Austerity 2-10-0

See also
 
 
 1980s austerity policy in Romania
 Asceticism, a lifestyle characterized by abstinence and austerity from various sorts of worldly pleasures often with the aim of pursuing religious and spiritual goals
 Austerity in Israel
 Special Period, Cuba